Adrian Popa may refer to:

 Adrian Popa (footballer, born 1988), Romanian footballer who plays as a winger/midfielder
 Adrian Popa (footballer, born 1990), Romanian footballer who plays as a defender
 Adrián Popa, Hungarian weightlifter